"Moon-Man Newfie" is a single by Canadian country music artist Stompin' Tom Connors. The song debuted at number 48 on the RPM Country Tracks chart on February 26, 1972. It peaked at number 1 on May 6, 1972.

Chart performance

References

1972 singles
Stompin' Tom Connors songs
Songs about Canada